Charles Edward Joseph Redwood (19 May 1878 – 16 February 1954) was a rugby union player who represented Australia.

Redwood, a wing, was born in Blenheim and claimed a total of 4 international rugby caps for Australia. His debut game was against New Zealand, at Sydney, on 15 August 1903.

References

Australian rugby union players
Australia international rugby union players
1878 births
1954 deaths
Rugby union players from Blenheim, New Zealand
Rugby union wings
New Zealand emigrants to Australia